Somyev (Somyewe), also known as Kila ("blacksmith" in Fulfulde), is a nearly extinct Mambiloid language of two villages, one in Nigeria and one in Cameroon, that is spoken by a caste of blacksmiths that live among the Mambila. Although the language is still used for daily communication, the youngest generation of speakers were born in the 1950s. Transmission of the language ceased when the profession of blacksmithing lost its social status, partly due to imports of foreign tools.

References

Mambiloid languages
Languages of Cameroon
Languages of Nigeria